Anopina macrospinana is a species of moth of the family Tortricidae. It is found in Michoacán, Mexico.

References

Moths described in 2000
macrospinana
Moths of Central America